Angèle is a given name. Notable people with the name include:

Angèle (singer) (born Angèle Van Laeken, 1995), Belgian singer
Angele Anang, Thai drag queen
Angèle Dola Akofa Aguigah (born 1955), Togolese archaeologist 
Angèle Arsenault (1943–2014), Canadian-Acadian singer, songwriter and media host
Angèle Bassolé-Ouédraogo (born 1967), Ivorian born Canadian poet and journalist
Angèle Dubeau (born 1962), Canadian Québécoise violinist
Angèle Etoundi Essamba (born 1962), Cameroonian photographer
Angèle Rawiri (born 1954), Gabonese novelist
Angéle de la Barthe (1230–1275), prosperous woman of Toulouse, France; tried for witchcraft and condemned to death by the Inquisition

See also
Angel (given name)
Angelle

French feminine given names